Kaio César Andrade Lima (born 15 February 2004), known as Kaio César or just Kaio, is a Brazilian footballer who plays as a forward for Coritiba.

Club career
Born in Maceió, Alagoas, Kaio joined Coritiba's youth setup in 2018, aged 14. On 15 December 2022, he renewed his contract with the club until 2024, being promoted to the first team for the 2023 season.

Kaio made his professional debut on 18 January 2023, coming on as a late substitute for Alef Manga in a 3–0 Campeonato Paranaense away win over Foz do Iguaçu. Eleven days later, in his first match as a starter, he scored his side's second in a 2–2 home draw against Azuriz.

On 8 February 2023, Coritiba announced the renewal of Kaio's contract until 2026.

Career statistics

References

External links
Coritiba profile 

2004 births
Living people
People from Maceió
Sportspeople from Alagoas
Brazilian footballers
Association football forwards
Coritiba Foot Ball Club players